Julia Garner (born February 1, 1994) is an American actress. She is best known for her starring role as Ruth Langmore in the Netflix crime drama series Ozark (2017–2022), for which she received critical acclaim and won three Primetime Emmy Awards for Outstanding Supporting Actress in a Drama Series in 2019,  2020, and 2022, and a Golden Globe Award for Best Supporting Actress in 2023.

Garner also had roles in the FX drama series The Americans (2015–2018), the Netflix miniseries Maniac (2018), the Bravo true crime series Dirty John (2018–2019). In 2022, she portrayed Anna Sorokin in the Netflix miniseries Inventing Anna, for which she received nominations for another Primetime Emmy Award and Golden Globe for Best Actress.

In films, she has starred in Grandma (2015), and The Assistant (2019), as well as having appeared in Martha Marcy May Marlene (2011), The Perks of Being a Wallflower (2012), and Sin City: A Dame to Kill For (2014).

Early life
Garner was born in the Riverdale neighborhood of The Bronx, New York. Her mother Tami Gingold is a therapist who had a successful career as an actress and comedian in her native Israel. Her father Thomas Garner is a painter and an art teacher, originally from Shaker Heights, Ohio. Garner is Jewish, as is her mother. Her older sister is artist Anna Garner. She understands modern Hebrew, because of her mother speaking it, but is not fluent.

She attended Eagle Hill School in Greenwich, Connecticut. She began taking acting lessons at age 15 to overcome her shyness. Garner graduated with a degree in psychology from Indiana University in 2015.

Career

Garner made her film debut at age 17 in Sean Durkin's Martha Marcy May Marlene, playing the role of Sarah.

In 2012, director David Chase invited her to play a small role he had written specifically for her in his film Not Fade Away. Her first starring role was in the 2012 film, Electrick Children. In 2013, she starred alongside Ashley Bell in the horror film The Last Exorcism Part II, and played the lead in the American remake of the Mexican horror film We Are What We Are.

Garner co-starred in Sin City: A Dame to Kill For (2014) as new character Marcie, a young stripper who crosses paths with another new character, Johnny (Joseph Gordon-Levitt). This marked the first time she acted against a green screen.

In 2015, Garner starred in the Paul Weitz-directed comedy film Grandma alongside Lily Tomlin. Garner played a teenaged student eliciting the help of her lesbian poet grandmother (Tomlin) for an abortion. In 2016, she appeared in an episode of Lena Dunham's HBO comedy series Girls titled "The Panic in Central Park".

Garner continued acting in television and was cast in a recurring role in the third season of the FX period spy-thriller series The Americans. She continued the role through season six. She was to have made her off-Broadway debut in Noah Haidle's play Smokefall at MCC Theater in 2016, but had to drop out during rehearsals because of scheduling conflicts.

Starting in 2017, Garner starred as Ruth Langmore in the Netflix crime drama series Ozark, opposite Jason Bateman and Laura Linney. The role gained her critical acclaim and three Primetime Emmy Awards for Outstanding Supporting Actress in a Drama Series.

In 2018, Garner appeared in the Netflix miniseries Maniac as Ellie, the sister of Emma Stone's character. Garner also made regular appearances in the Bravo true crime anthology series Dirty John (2018–19). She starred as Terra Newell, the daughter of Connie Britton's character.

In 2019, Garner appeared in the Amazon anthology series, Modern Love. She was featured in two episodes of its first season as a woman who has a crush on a much older man, played by Shea Whigham. That same year, she starred in the independent drama film The Assistant as a production assistant in a toxic work environment. The film, directed by Kitty Green, addressed the current culture surrounding the MeToo movement. The film premiered at the 2019 Telluride Film Festival to critical acclaim. Garner received acclaim for her performance as well as an Independent Spirit Award nomination.

Garner also co-stars in the Netflix miniseries Inventing Anna, playing the titular role of fraudster Anna (Sorokin) Delvey. The series was created and produced by Shonda Rhimes, based on the New York article "How Anna Delvey Tricked New York's Party People" by Jessica Pressler. It was released on Netflix on February 11, 2022.

In 2022, Garner was cast in thriller film Apartment 7A, directed by Natalie Erika James and was set to star in The Royal Hotel directed by Kitty Green.

Personal life
Garner married singer Mark Foster, lead vocalist of Foster the People, in a December 2019 ceremony at the New York City Hall, eight months after they got engaged.

Filmography

Film

Television

Awards and nominations

References

External links 

 

1994 births
Living people
21st-century American actresses
Actresses from New York City
American film actresses
American television actresses
American people of Israeli descent
American Ashkenazi Jews
Jewish American actresses
People from Riverdale, Bronx
Outstanding Performance by a Supporting Actress in a Drama Series Primetime Emmy Award winners
Best Supporting Actress Golden Globe (television) winners
21st-century American Jews